Raúl Antonio Suárez Góngora (born 25 September 1995) is a Mexican professional footballer who plays as a midfielder.

Career

Atlante
Suárez came out of the Atlante F.C. youth system. He made his professional debut on 26 August 2014 in a Copa MX match against Toluca at 18 years old.

Loan at Venados
In December 2014, it was announced Suárez was sent out on loan to Mérida F.C., which was later renamed Venados. He made his Ascenso MX debut on 23 January 2015 against Irapuato. Suárez showed promising aspects with Venados.

Loan at Guadalajara
On 17 December 2015, Liga MX giants C.D. Guadalajara announced they had signed Suárez on a 1 year-loan with the option of purpose. That same day, they announced he would first participate with the Under-20s and the Reserve squad in order to win himself a shot at the first team squad. He only managed to get playing time with the reserve squad.

Return to Atlante
Suárez returned to Atlante after his loan ended and was registered with the first team.

Personal life
His younger brother, Vladimir, is also a professional footballer who currently plays as a forward for Ascenso MX side Venados.

References

References
 
 

1995 births
Living people
Mexican footballers
Association football midfielders
Atlante F.C. footballers
Venados F.C. players
Ascenso MX players
Liga de Expansión MX players
Footballers from Yucatán
Sportspeople from Mérida, Yucatán